Peter Eneji Moses (born 8 April 1999) is a Nigerian international footballer who last played for Sereď in the Slovak Fortuna Liga, as a striker.

Club career
Born in Jos, he spent his early career with Plateau United and Akwa United.

He signed for Senica in July 2019. He scored on his debut for the club later that month, coming off the substitutes' bench to score 2 goals.

In February 2021 he signed for Sereď, and made his debut for the club on 20 February 2021 in a 2:0 win over Zemplín Michalovce.

International career
Moses made his international debut for Nigeria in 2018, having also played for the Nigerian under-20 team.

References

1999 births
Living people
People from Jos
Nigerian footballers
Nigeria under-20 international footballers
Nigeria international footballers
Plateau United F.C. players
Akwa United F.C. players
Association football forwards
FK Senica players
ŠKF Sereď players
Slovak Super Liga players
Nigerian expatriate footballers
Nigerian expatriate sportspeople in Slovakia
Expatriate footballers in Slovakia
Nigeria A' international footballers
2018 African Nations Championship players